Events in the year 1556 in Japan.

Incumbents
Monarch: Go-Nara

Births
January 8 - Uesugi Kagekatsu (d. 1623), daimyō

References

 
1550s in Japan
Japan
Years of the 16th century in Japan